Boletellus badiovinosus is a species of fungus in the family Boletaceae. Found in Papua New Guinea, it was described as new to science by Egon Horak in 1977.

References

Fungi described in 1977
Fungi of New Guinea
badiovinosus